James Edward Jack Patterson (2 July 1884 – 21 July 1964) was a Liberal party member of the House of Commons of Canada. He was born in Salisbury, New Brunswick and became a civil engineer, farmer and land surveyor.

Patterson attended the University of New Brunswick, earning a Bachelor of Science degree.

Patterson was a councillor for Carleton County, New Brunswick from 1925 to 1935.

He was first elected to Parliament at the Victoria—Carleton riding in the 1935 general election. After completing one term, the 18th Canadian Parliament, Patterson left the House of Commons and did not seek another term in the 1940 election.

References

External links
 

1884 births
1964 deaths
Canadian civil engineers
Canadian farmers
Canadian surveyors
Liberal Party of Canada MPs
Members of the House of Commons of Canada from New Brunswick
New Brunswick municipal councillors
University of New Brunswick alumni